Planking (or the Lying Down Game) is an activity consisting of lying in a face down position, sometimes in an unusual or incongruous location. The palms of the hands are typically touching the sides of the body and the toes are typically touching the ground. Some players compete to find the most unusual and original location in which to play. The term planking refers to mimicking a wooden plank. Planking can include lying flat on a flat surface, or holding the body flat while it is supported in only some regions, with other parts of the body suspended. Many participants in planking have photographed the activity in unusual locations and have shared such pictures through social media.

Planking gained popularity rapidly and eventually notoriety from early-mid 2011 before slowly phasing out in early 2012.

History
A planking-like activity, called face dancing by its participants, was initiated in 1984 in Edmonds, Washington in the US by Scott Amy and Joel Marshall. The two high school age boys were walking in a park when they came upon a baseball game. They decided to lie face down in right field to see if anyone would react.

The first video-recorded occurrence of planking was in 1994 when Tom Green performed a stunt he called "Dead Guy" for a cable TV show, which consisted of Green lying down on an Ottawa sidewalk without moving. Green, who was in an MTV show in the 1990s, is a comedian known for his pranks.  He informed CNN about this video evidence and how it did not air on the show, stating that it was "a very obscure piece of video." Green tweeted "Just found video of me #planking in 1994. I will post it soon. Let people know. :)" on July 12, 2011.
	 	
However, the video sketch was never aired. So when, in 1997, two bored school boys in Taunton, England, started lying face-down in public places to amuse themselves and baffle onlookers, they could not have known of Green's stunt. Gary Clarkson (then aged 15) and Christian Langdon (then aged 12) called it the "lying down game". As Clarkson puts it, "It was just a really stupid, random thing to do." The Lying Down Game remained within Clarkson and Langdon's circle of friends until 2007, when their friend Daniel Hoppin created a Facebook page for their craze. As Hoppin says, "We began a Facebook group to see who could get the craziest photo."

The term "Planking" was coined by Sam Weckert, Darcy McCann and Kym Berry of Adelaide, South Australia: "Planking was a term myself and two other mates came up with in the summer of 2008". Weckert created a Facebook fan page to share "planking" photos. After reports of the practice started appearing in the Australian media, it grew rapidly and the meme became a global phenomenon. After reports of the craze in the British media in 2009, Planking spread to the rest of the world. Worldwide it has also been known as "extreme lying down" (2008, Australasia), "facedowns" (2010, USA and Ireland), and "planking" (2011, Australia, New Zealand and worldwide). In the years following its explosion in popularity, several variations on planking have proliferated, some inspired by the fad, and others that have arisen independently.

Controversies 
The popularity of planking has generated a backlash. Some people object to the more ridiculous photos that have circulated, such as a girl planking with her head in a toilet or a woman planking on a stripper pole. Also, planking in dangerous places has resulted in many injuries and at least one death.

Notable incidents 
 The planking fad made news in September 2009, when seven accident and emergency staff working at the Great Western Hospital in Swindon, England were suspended for playing the "lying down game" during a night shift and posting photos to Facebook. They were considered to have breached health and safety and infection control regulations.
 On 15 May 2011, Acton Beale, a 20-year-old man, plunged to his death after reportedly "planking" on a seventh-floor balcony in Brisbane, Australia. The Darwin Awards recognised this incident in their 2011 edition.
 On 29 May 2011, Max Key, son of New Zealand Prime Minister John Key, uploaded to Facebook a photograph of himself planking on a lounge suite, his father standing behind him. Afterwards, the photograph was reproduced on the front page of the New Zealand Herald. Confirming that the photograph was indeed genuine, John Key remarked that he doesn't see anything wrong with planking when done safely. Key was criticised for his appearance in the photograph, with some going as far as to comment that he "killed" the meme.
 On 2 September 2011, Dwight Howard and about 100 of his fans planked in Beijing, China as part of a promotional Adidas campaign.
 On 20 January 2012, Pat Barry planked on television after a mixed martial arts match in which he won a knockout victory over his opponent.

In popular culture 
 The fall 2011 season premiere of the U.S. version of The Office featured several employees planking in the parking lots, the restroom, on desks, and on top of file cabinets.
American hip hop artists Kanye West and Jay-Z reference planking in their 2011 single "Gotta Have It".
 In "Faith Hilling", the 28 March 2012 episode of the animated American TV series South Park, trends such as planking were parodied.
Regina Spektor planks multiple times in her 2012 music video for "Don't Leave Me (Ne Me Quitte Pas)".
In the 2014 animated film Mr. Peabody and Sherman, Mr. Peabody, the talking, genius dog claims to have invented planking.
On July 6, 2019, Israel Adesanya referenced planking in a commentary of "UFC 239: Jones vs. Santos" after Jorge Masvidal delivered the fastest knockout in UFC history.
 Throughout the Super Smash Bros. series starting with Melee, one of Luigi's victory animations in multiplayer matches shows him planking twice, to comical effect.

Gallery

Athletic Planking 
Despite its origin as a form of humorous human position, planking has notable practical uses in certain athletic endeavors. As an example, the act of lowering one's perspective can convey important information. One application is reading greens on a golf course. PGA Tour professional golfer Martin Trainer is known to utilize his pioneering seal-style plank to read putting greens.

Derivative posing fads and variations 

 Teapotting consists of bending the arms into the shape of a teapot, in reference to the children's song "I'm a Little Teapot". This variation was created by teachers in Mortlake College in an attempt to create a new 'craze' after noticing the amount of attention given to planking.
 Playing Dead (known as "시체놀이" in Korean) originated in South Korea in 2003. It involves a large number of participants pretending to be dead. It was inspired by the manga character Crayon Shin-Chan and is thought to have arisen independently of planking.
 Hadoukening also known as Makankosappo, involves multiple people staging a "Ki attack" knockout sequence and photographing themselves in mid-action, posed like in the popular Japanese fighting arcade game Street Fighter or manga series Dragon Ball.
 Gallon smashing involves a person spilling a gallon of liquid (usually milk), then "falling" and having a hard time getting back up.
 Vadering mimics Darth Vader's Force Choke hold. One person has their hand up in a choking gesture, while their "victim" looks to be raised off the ground while clutching at their neck.

 Owling is a variation on planking in which a person squats "like an owl" in a populated but unusual area. Participants commonly make noises similar to an owl, to make the owl impression more realistic. It was first documented on 11 July 2011 in a post on the social news website reddit.
 Horsemaning involves posing two people so that they appear to be a single body with a detached head and is a revival of a photography fad popular in the 1920s. It is thought that the name comes from the Headless Horseman in Washington Irving's short story The Legend of Sleepy Hollow.

 Batmanning involves hanging upside down by the feet.
 Dufnering is a variation of planking that involves a person lying with the bottom half of their body on the floor, the top half leaning up, their arms close to the side of their body, and their hands ending towards the bottom of their thighs. The person would also be looking straightforward. The fad began when Rory McIlroy tweeted a photo of himself imitating 2013 PGA Championship winner Jason Dufner.
 Pratting is a variation of planking that was spawned from a scene in the film Jurassic World in which Chris Pratt's character uses a defensive posture in order to save himself from velociraptors while inside of their cage. The pose requires the user to have their knees slightly bent, head forward, arms extended out far (sometimes with one closer to the subject) and fingers up. Immediately following the film's wide release, many zookeepers posted images of themselves in similar formation with their respective animals.

References

External links 

 Web Urbanist article with images of planking

2000s fads and trends
Crowd psychology
Internet culture
Internet memes
Play (activity)
Australian inventions
1984 introductions